Jean Borg (born 8 January 1998) is a Maltese international footballer who plays for Italian  club Fidelis Andria as a left back.

Club career
He has played club football for Valletta.

On 20 January 2023, Borg signed with Fidelis Andria in the Italian third-tier Serie C.

International career
He made his international debut for Malta in 2018.

Notes

References

1998 births
Living people
Maltese footballers
Malta youth international footballers
Malta under-21 international footballers
Malta international footballers
Association football fullbacks
Valletta F.C. players
S.S. Fidelis Andria 1928 players
Maltese Premier League players
Maltese expatriate footballers
Expatriate footballers in Italy
Maltese expatriate sportspeople in Italy